Lake Cargelligo is a town in the Central West region of New South Wales, Australia, on Lake Cargelligo. It is in Lachlan Shire. Its name is said to be a corruption of the Aboriginal word kartjellakoo meaning 'he had a coolamon'. Alternatively it is derived from Wiradjuri and Ngiyambaa "gajal" for water container with suffix "lugu" for "her" or "his". In 2016, it had an indigenous population of 239 (16.2%) and other Australian-born population of 1,186 (together 80.4% of the population).

History 
The area now known as Lake Cargelligo lies within the traditional lands of the Wiradjuri people.

The explorers, John Oxley and George Evans, followed the Lachlan River down to Lake Cargelligo in 1817.
Lake Cargelligo was known as Cudgelligo (or sometimes Cudgellico) in the 1800s and was officially changed when the railway arrived in 1917.

After colonial settlement, the land was taken over by settlers and the local Aboriginal population was removed from their traditional country and consolidated at other locations, under the control of the Aboriginal Protection Board. In 1907, official records showed no Aboriginal people as living at 'Cudgellico Lake'. In 1949, a population of Wiradjuri, together with Ngiyampaa and Paakantyi people—from traditional lands west of the Wiradjuri lands—totalling 240 people was relocated from Menindee to a camp at Murrin Bridge about 15km from Lake Cargelligo.

Culture
Lake Cargelligo has a culture of watersports on the lake. 

The town, along with nearby Tullibigeal has a rugby league team in the Group 20 Rugby League competition, nicknamed the Sharks.

Transport 
The railway from Cootamundra to  Wyalong was extended to Lake Cargelligo in 1917. The railway station opened as 'Cargelligo' in 1917 and was renamed 'Lake Cargelligo' in 1919. Rail-motor passenger services operated to the town until 1983. Since then the railway link has been used for cargo transport, especially for bulk grain which the surrounding farms cultivate.
It also has a strong World War I background and ANZAC heritage.

Mining 
Rich mineral deposites are found in the area around the township. Mines include:
 Bevs Gossanous Mine
 Fosters Reef Gold Mine
 The Whitton Road Mine is an open cut magnesite mine.
 Allys Zone Mine
 Browns Reef Mine an open cut and underground copper, lead, silver and zinc mine.
 Bevs Gossanous Zone Mine
 Billys Lead Zone Mine

Solar Thermal Power Station 
Lake Cargelligo is the site of the Lake Cargelligo Thermal Power Station, a concentrated Solar Thermal Power station.

The plant uses dual axes sun tracking mirrors (heliostats) to reflect solar energy onto central towers to heat up multiple graphite solar storage receivers. The heat is then used to generate electricity via a 3MWe steam turbine generator, related steam cycle plant and controls.

The 620 heliostats have a combined reflective surface area of 6 080 m².

The plant was constructed using a grant from the Australian Government's Advanced Electricity Storage Technologies (AEST) Program. The plant commenced operation in May 2011. More details on the project can be obtained from the Final Public Report – Commonwealth of Australia Department of Resource, Energy and Tourism, August 2011.

By 2014, the operator had accumulated more than 25,000 hours of operating data from the solar power plant.

In 2016, the owner announced plans to dismantle the Lake Cargelligo site for redevelopment. The new site will be used for research and development as well as for demonstration purposes. Construction of the new site is set to begin early 2017.

The lake 

As its name would suggest, the town of Lake Cargelligo is situated on a lake fed by the Lachlan River through Lake Curlew. The lake was originally named Regent's Lake by the explorer John Oxley after the prince regent of England at the time. The lake was the primary water source for the early mining town, and has continued to remain an integral source of water for Lake Cargelligo's inhabitants and for all users along the lower Lachlan. These days the lake serves recreational uses as well, bird watchers are by far the largest group of visitors to the lake and surrounds due to the incredible diversity of waterfowl and other rare birds in the district. Boating, fishing and water skiing, also contribute to the town's tourism industry.

While the lake was natural, it was not permanent. Earthworks were conducted, in the late 19th century and using horse and scoop, to build a levee bank and deepen sections of the lake, so that it would become more permanent.  After many years of drought, it was reported in early 2010 that the lake ran dry for the first time since 1902.

Gallery

References

External links 

 
 

Towns in the Central West (New South Wales)
Lachlan Shire
Lakes of New South Wales
Mining towns in New South Wales